Attenuator could mean:
 Attenuator (electronics), an electronic device that reduces the amplitude of an electronic signal.
 Optical attenuator, an electronic device that reduces the amplitude of an optical signal.
 Attenuator (genetics), a specific regulatory sequence transcribed into RNA.
 Impact attenuator, used on highways as a crumple zone in case of a car crash.

See also
 Attenuation (disambiguation)